Bifaxariidae is a family of bryozoans belonging to the order Cheilostomatida.

Genera:
 Aberrodomus Gordon, 1988
 Bifaxaria Busk, 1884
 Diplonotos Canu & Bassler, 1930
 Domosclerus Gordon, 1988
 Raxifabia Gordon, 1988

References

Bryozoan families